Aaron Westervelt (born 21 November 1979) is an Australian football (soccer) player who plays as a central midfielder for Adelaide Victory FC in the National Premier Leagues State League.

Club career
In 2011, he won the Milan Ivanovic medal for best player in the FFSA State League.

References

1979 births
Living people
Australian soccer players
Association football midfielders
Australian Institute of Sport soccer players
National Soccer League (Australia) players
FFSA Super League players
West Adelaide SC players
Playford City Patriots SC players
West Torrens Birkalla SC players
Para Hills Knights players
Enfield City FC players
Adelaide United FC players
Modbury Jets SC players
Panachaiki F.C. players
Heidelberg United FC players
Seaford Rangers FC players
Adelaide Cobras FC players
Adelaide Victory FC players
Salisbury United FC players
Adelaide Olympic FC players
Noarlunga United SC players
Australian expatriate soccer players
Australian expatriate sportspeople in Greece
Expatriate footballers in Greece
Soccer players from Adelaide